Louisiana's 18th State Senate district is one of 39 districts in the Louisiana State Senate. It has been represented by Republican Eddie Lambert since 2016.

Geography
District 18 covers parts of Ascension, Livingston, and St. James Parishes to the east of Baton Rouge, including some or all of Gonzales, Sorrento, Prairieville, Killian, and Lutcher.

The district overlaps with Louisiana's 2nd and 6th congressional districts, and with the 58th, 59th, 81st, 88th, and 95th districts of the Louisiana House of Representatives.

Recent election results
Louisiana uses a jungle primary system. If no candidate receives 50% in the first round of voting, when all candidates appear on the same ballot regardless of party, the top-two finishers advance to a runoff election.

2019

2015

2011

Federal and statewide results in District 18

References

Louisiana State Senate districts
Ascension Parish, Louisiana
Livingston Parish, Louisiana
St. James Parish, Louisiana